Kaloleni may refer to
 Kaloleni, Tanzania, an administrative ward in the Arusha District of the Arusha Region of Tanzania
 Kaloleni, Kenya, a settlement in Kilifi County in Kenya
 Kaloleni, Nairobi, a suburb in the city of Nairobi in Kenya
 Kaloleni Constituency, an electoral constituency in Kenya, one of three constituencies in Kilifi County